Pilot Creek is a  long 2nd order tributary to the Ararat River in Surry County, North Carolina.

Course
Pilot Creek rises in a pond on the Chinquapin Creek divide about 0.25 miles southeast of Pilot Mountain, North Carolina.  Pilot Creek then flows southwesterly to join the Ararat River about 5 miles east of Pine Hill, North Carolina.

Watershed
Pilot Creek drains  of area, receives about 47.8 in/year of precipitation, has a wetness index of 325.23, and is about 60% forested.

See also
List of rivers of North Carolina

References

Rivers of North Carolina
Rivers of Surry County, North Carolina